The ileocolic vein is a vein which drains the ileum, colon, and cecum.

Veins of the torso